Ingerophrynus macrotis is a toad species of the family Bufonidae, which is found throughout most of monsoonal mainland Southeast Asia and in northeast India. It is native to Cambodia, Laos, Malaysia, Myanmar, Thailand, Vietnam. Its presence in China is uncertain.

Characteristics
Crown without bony ridges; snout short, truncated; interorbital space flat, as broad as the upper eyelid; tympanum very distinct, vertically oval, quite as large as the eye and close to it. First finger a little longer than second; toes barely half webbed, with irregular spinose tubercles beneath, from which the so-called subarticular are hardly distinguishable; two small metatarsal tubercles; no tarsal fold. The tarso-metatarsal tubercle reaches the tympanum or the eye. Upper parts studded with round tubercles of various sizes; parotoids prominent, subcircular. Grey-brown or olive above, with irregular dark brown spots, vertical bars on the upper lip, and cross bands on the limbs; lower surfaces dirty white, with darker spots; the male's throat brown. Male with a subgular vocal sac and, during the nuptial period, black rugosities on the inner fingers.

Distribution and habitat 
It is generally associated with both open-canopy and closed deciduous forest types. It breeds explosively in rain-pools. It is able to survive in relatively degraded forest.

Its natural habitats are subtropical or tropical dry forests, subtropical or tropical moist lowland forests, subtropical or tropical moist montane forests, subtropical or tropical moist shrubland, and intermittent freshwater marshes.

References

macrotis
Amphibians of Myanmar
Amphibians of Cambodia
Frogs of India
Amphibians of Laos
Amphibians of Malaysia
Amphibians of Thailand
Amphibians of Vietnam
Amphibians described in 1887